Mount Thielsen, or Big Cowhorn (Klamath: hisc’akwaleeʔas), is an extinct shield volcano in the Oregon High Cascades, near Mount Bailey. Because eruptive activity ceased 250,000 years ago, glaciers have heavily eroded the volcano's structure, creating precipitous slopes and a horn-like peak. The spire-like shape of Thielsen attracts lightning strikes and creates fulgurite, an unusual mineral. The prominent horn forms a centerpiece for the Mount Thielsen Wilderness, a reserve for recreational activities such as skiing and hiking. Thielson is one of Oregon's Matterhorns.

Thielsen was produced by subduction of the Juan de Fuca Plate under the North American Plate. Volcanism near the Cascades dates back to 55 million years ago (mya), and extends from British Columbia to California. Thielsen is part of the High Cascades, a branch of the main Cascades range that includes several Oregon volcanoes less than 3.5 million years old; it is also a member of a group of extinct volcanoes distinguished by their sharp peaks.

The area surrounding the volcano was originally inhabited by Klamath Native Americans, and was later encountered by settlers. One of the visitors was Jon Hurlburt, an early explorer of the area who named the volcano after the engineer Hans Thielsen. Later explorers discovered nearby Crater Lake. The volcano was not analyzed until 1884, when a team from the United States Geological Survey sampled its fulgurite deposits.

History 

The area was originally inhabited by Chinook Native Americans, who referred to the mountain as "Hischokwolas"; the Klamath call it "hisc'akwaleeas". Jon Hurlburt, a Polish explorer, renamed the volcano after Hans Thielsen, a railroad engineer and builder who played a major role in the construction of the California and Oregon Railroad.

In 1884 a United States Geological Survey team headed by J. S. Diller began studying the mountains of the Cascade Range. Their intended destinations included Thielsen, which was climbed and sampled for its fulgurite variant. Thielsen's spire-like top is hit by lightning so frequently that some rocks on the summit have melted into a rare mineraloid known as lechatelierite, a variety of fulgurite. The mountain has earned the nickname "the lightning rod of the Cascades".

Apart from study, Thielsen and the rest of the Crater Lake area features heavily into 19th- and early 20th century exploration. In 1853, miners from Yreka first described Crater Lake; one called it "the bluest water he had ever seen", another "deep blue lake". The first published description was written by Chauncy Nye for the Jacksonville Sentinel in 1862. Nye recalled an expedition of gold prospectors where they passed a lake of a deep blue color. Native Americans lived in the area and grew irritable towards new settlers in the area. In 1865, Fort Klamath was built as a protective sanctuary. A wagon road was built to connect the Rogue Valley to the fort. In late 1865, two hunters ventured upon the lake; more explorers followed. By then, the lake became famous for its distinctive color, and crowds flocked to see it. The first known non-Native American to stand on the shore of Crater Lake was Sergeant Orsen Stearns, who climbed down into the caldera. A friend, Captain F.B. Sprague, gave it the name "Lake Majesty". Tourism continued until May 22, 1902; on that day, Theodore Roosevelt designated the lake and surrounding area a national park.

Geography

Regional 

The Cascade Range was produced by convergence of the North American Plate with the subducting Juan de Fuca Plate. Active volcanism has taken place for approximately 36 million years; the nearby Challis Range features complexes as old as 55 mya. Most geologists believe that activity in the Cascades has been relatively intermittent, producing up to 3,000 volcanic calderas at a time. Frequent volcanism within the last 10,000 years created complexes from Mount Garibaldi in British Columbia to north California's Lassen Peak complex. Remarkably different from state to state, the volcanism ranges from large volcanoes to zones of many smaller geologic features such as lava shields and cinder cones. Volcanic peaks of the Cascade Mountains are grouped into two ranges, called the High Cascades and the Western Cascades; Thielsen is part of the High Cascades, which are east of the Western Cascades.

Local 

Diamond Lake, formed by one of Thielsen's eruptions, lies to the west of Mount Thielsen and beyond lies Mount Bailey, a much less eroded and younger stratovolcano. Thielsen's sharp peak is a prominent feature of the skyline visible from Crater Lake National Park. All three volcanoes are part of the Oregon High Cascades, a range that sections off the stratovolcanoes of Oregon that are younger than 3.5 million years. The High Cascades include Mount Jefferson, the Three Sisters, Broken Top, and other stratovolcanoes and remnants.

Rock in the area ages from the Upper Pliocene and Quaternary. Basalt and basaltic andesite comprise newer volcanoes atop the High Cascades: Major volcanic centers include Mount Hood, Three Sisters / Broken Top, Mount Mazama (Crater Lake), and Mount Jefferson. All have produced diverse eruptions, including both lava flows and pyroclastic eruptions, and variability in composition between dacite, basalt, and even rhyolite (except for Mount Hood, which is not known to have produced rhyolite). Other Matterhorns include Mount Washington, Three Fingered Jack, Mount Bailey, and Diamond Peak. Unlike other mountains in the High Cascades, all these volcanoes became extinct 250,000–100,000 years ago, and their summits endured the last few ice ages, accounting for their distinct shapes.

Geology 

Thielsen has been so deeply eroded by glaciers that there is no summit crater and the upper part of the mountain is more or less a horn. Thielsen is a relatively old Cascade volcano, and cone-building eruptions stopped relatively early. Erosion caused during the last two or three ice ages remains visible.

The placement of these flows suggest that they were generated by spatter emitted by fountains in the cone. On the sides of the mountain are bands of palagonite, a clay formed from iron-rich tephra making up the body of the volcano. Basalt taken from the volcano contained pyroxene, hypersthene material, and feldspars.

Other notable formations in the vicinity include Howlock Mountain, Windigo Butte, and Tolo Mountain. Other than Crater Lake, little water flows on the surface, but small streams have formed in canyons excavated by glaciers.

Composition 
The cone was built from basaltic andesite, a common component of other shield volcanoes in the Oregon Cascades, breccia, and tuff, and it is intruded by dikes. A coalesced volcanic cone, it formed as pyroclastics erupted and fountains spewed lava. Glaciers cut and deformed the cone, eroding its upper sector. This erosion opened the interior of Thielsen for observation. Within the cone, lava flows, pyroclastic flow deposits, and strata of tephra, and volcanic ash, are easily visible. Potassium-argon dating of deposits in the cone suggests that Thielsen is at least 290,000 years old. Since its eruption stopped about 250,000–100,000 years ago, the period of eruptive activity was short in time. The eruptions of the cone came in three phases: a period where lava flows built up its cone, one where more explosive pyroclastic eruptions took place, and the final period, in which pyroclastic and material of lava-based origin were erupted together forming a weak cone encircled by long deposits.

Glaciation 
Glaciers were present on the volcano until the conclusion of the Little Ice Age, at the beginning of the 20th century. Pleistocene glaciers have largely eroded Thielsen's caldera, exposing its contents. The last glacier on the mountain, the small Lathrop Glacier located in the northern cirque, melted at some point after 2016. Whilst the glaciation was previously extensive, volcanic ash from eruptive activity at Mount Mazama has almost certainly masked contents.

Fulgurites 
Lightning strikes the summit regularly, creating patches of "brownish black to olive-black glass" that resemble "greasy splotches of enamel paint". Their appearance also varies: While some patches are rough and spongy, others are flat. Inspection of the fulgurite reveals a homogenous glass over a layer of basalt; in between, a stratum made of materials such as feldspar, pyroxene, and olivine exists.

Ecology 

A grove of enormous incense cedars exists near Diamond Lake, and there is a forest of ponderosa pine at the nearby Emile Big Tree Trail. The Umpqua National Forest features swordferns and Douglas firs. Rocky Mountain elks, pronghorns, and mule deer, bobcats, black bears, and mountain lions live in the Fremont–Winema National Forest. The forest's rivers support populations of trout, and the lakes contain fish such as the largemouth bass. The forest is inhabited by avian species such as mallards, American bald eagles, Canada geese, and whistling swans. Peregrine falcons and Warner suckers also infrequently enter its boundaries.

The lower slopes of Mount Thielsen are heavily forested, with low diversity of plant species. Near the peak of the volcano, whitebark pine prevails.

Recreation 
Mount Thielsen lies in the southern section of the Mount Thielsen Wilderness, which is part of the Deschutes, Umpqua and Fremont–Winema national forests. On the west, the wilderness borders the Oregon Cascades Recreation Area, a  area set aside by Congress in 1984. The wilderness and forests offer several activities related to the mountain, such as hiking and skiing. The wilderness covers  around the volcano, featuring lakes and alpine parks. It also contains  of the Pacific Crest National Scenic Trail, accessible from a trailhead along Oregon Highway 138. In 2009 the trail was selected as Oregon's best hike. Three skiing trails exist on the mountain, all of black diamond rating. They follow several trails through the wilderness from the bowl of the mountain.

References

Bibliography 

 
 
 
 
 
 
 
 

Cascade Range
Cascade Volcanoes
Extinct volcanoes
Fremont–Winema National Forest
Landforms of Douglas County, Oregon
Mountains of Douglas County, Oregon
Mountains of Klamath County, Oregon
Mountains of Oregon
Pleistocene shield volcanoes
Polygenetic shield volcanoes
Shield volcanoes of the United States
Subduction volcanoes
Umpqua National Forest
Volcanoes of Klamath County, Oregon
Volcanoes of Oregon